Mellow Lane School was a comprehensive school, located in Hayes, in 
the London Borough of Hillingdon, Middlesex. It closed in 2011 and reopened in August of that year, as Hewens College.

History

The school was opened in 1938. It housed two departments, run as separate entities: the Mellow Lane Senior Boys' School and the Mellow Lane Senior Girls' School.

In 1948, Mellow Lane was established as a co-educational comprehensive school. It was then one of only two experimental comprehensives in the UK permitted by the UK Government.
It was a grant-maintained school between 1 April 1992 and 31 August 1999, and became a foundation secondary comprehensive school on 1 September 1999.

The architects of the building were Curtis and Burchett. The building was extended in 1949 and 1963.

Houses
There were four houses during much of the school's existence: Dower, which was red; Manor, which was blue; Park, which was green; and Round, which was yellow. These were named after local manor houses.

Notable alumni
 Parmjit Dhanda (born 1971) — MP for Gloucester
 Anne-Marie Duff (born 1970) — British actress
 Ray Iles (born 1963) — scientist, academic, entrepreneur
 Dame Cleo Laine DBE (born 1927) — jazz and pop singer
 Steve Priest (born 1948) — bass guitarist, member of the group The Sweet
 John Sissons (born 1945) — footballer
 Rhoys Wiggins (born 1987) — Welsh international footballer

References

External links
 Archived Mellow Lane School official website
 Ofsted Mellow Lane report
 Archive pictures and documents on Mellow Lane
 Mellow Lane Girls Choir in the 1950s

Defunct schools in the London Borough of Hillingdon
Defunct grammar schools in England
Educational institutions established in 1938
Educational institutions disestablished in 2011
1938 establishments in England
2011 disestablishments in England